"Better Watch Out" is the eleventh single by Ant & Dec, formerly known as PJ & Duncan and the first to be taken from their final album, The Cult of Ant & Dec. The song has no relation to Christmas, and is instead about a man who tries to court a girl only to get confronted by her brothers. The video starts with Ant & Dec in a barbershop.

Track listing

Weekly Charts

References

1996 singles
Ant & Dec songs
1996 songs
Songs written by Ray Hedges
Songs written by Martin Brannigan
Telstar Records singles
Songs written by Anthony McPartlin
Songs written by Declan Donnelly